The following is a list of characters from the Australian television series Wentworth.

Main characters

Bea Smith

Bea Smith (Danielle Cormack) (seasons 1–4) came to be an inmate after attempting to murder her husband, Harry, after she had endured years of domestic violence. After entering the facility she is coveted by both Franky Doyle and Jacs Holt in their fight for "Top Dog" of the prison. Bea struggles adjusting to her new life in prison as well as trying to keep up with her daughter, Debbie, and her husband while they are on the outside world. After Bea's daughter is murdered on the order of Jacs Holt, Bea kills her by jabbing a pen into her neck and is charged with manslaughter. After believing that Debbie committed suicide, it is later revealed to Bea that Debbie was murdered by Brayden Holt, Jacs' son. Hellbent on revenge, Bea concocts a plan to escape Wentworth and kill Brayden for killing Debbie. After a bloody fight with Franky, Bea slices her own wrists, as sliced wrists cannot be cuffed, and is transferred to hospital where she escapes after being treated. Bea finds Brayden and holds him hostage in his mechanic shop where she gets him to confess to killing Debbie, after which she kills him. Bea is charged with murder and returns to Wentworth as the new "Top Dog".  She maintains a tough anti-drug trafficking policy with inmates.  During a fire started by Ferguson, after killing Jess, Bea saves Doreen's baby and Franky.  Bea is serving life without parole.  Loneliness, the loss of Debbie and the stress of being "Top Dog" over time takes its toll on Bea. Season four widely focuses on Bea discovering a side of herself she never believed to be there after falling in love with new inmate Allie Novak. In the finale of season 4, Bea believes Allie to be dead after she was given a hotshot (a lethal amount of illicit drugs) by Joan Ferguson. As Joan is walking out of the prison following her release, Bea confronts her with a screwdriver. After a struggle ensues between the two, Joan gains control of the screwdriver and Bea impales herself onto it 8 times followed by a further 5 stab wounds from Joan herself, which cause Bea’s death and ensure that Joan cannot be released from Wentworth and will be forced to remain in custody until her trial.

Franky Doyle

Francesca "Franky" Doyle (Nicole da Silva) (seasons 1–6; 7) is an inmate at Wentworth Correctional Centre. Franky was sent to Wentworth after she was charged with assault for throwing boiling oil on a television presenter of a cooking show that she was participating on for criticizing her food. Franky is a lesbian who has had relationships with some of the inmates and staff at Wentworth. Franky has been paroled and is in a relationship with forensic psychologist, Bridget Westfall.

Vera Bennett
Vera Bennett (Kate Atkinson) (seasons 1–8) is the former Deputy Governor at Wentworth Correctional Centre. Vera is shown as a timid and shy individual who has difficulty forming friendships and relationships due to having to take care of her mother. Rather than confiding in her colleagues about her mother, Vera lies about having a boyfriend named Adam. Vera forms a relationship with her co-worker, Matthew "Fletch" Fletcher, however their relationship ends after Vera reads Fletch's journal. In season 2, Vera becomes the project of governor, Joan Ferguson where she changes her personality into one that is much stronger and not so much of a shy pushover.
In the season 4 premiere, Vera is appointed the new Prison Governor of Wentworth after Joan is charged with the murder of former inmate, Jess Warner and is remanded in custody awaiting sentencing.

Doreen Anderson
Doreen Anderson (Shareena Clanton) (seasons 1–5) is an inmate at Wentworth Correctional Centre. Doreen was charged with reckless endangerment for losing her unborn baby after having a car accident due to heavily drinking and drug use.

During season two Doreen gets pregnant by Nash, an inmate from Walford, during the construction of the greenhouse.

Liz Birdsworth
Elizabeth "Liz" Birdsworth (Celia Ireland) (seasons 1–7) is an inmate at Wentworth Correctional Centre. Liz is a recovering alcoholic, who was first sent to Wentworth for the manslaughter of her mother-in-law. While under the influence of alcohol, Liz drove a tractor over a party setup for her mother-in-law's birthday after stressing that it was not going to be good enough. To avoid running over her daughter, Liz turned the tractor but accidentally ran over and killed her mother-in-law. Liz was the peer worker of the prison, dealing with inmates and the staff if there was an issue. However, Liz lost the right to be peer worker after she relapsed into her alcoholism. Since then Liz has been on and off with her addiction. Eventually, Liz makes parole and tries to start her life anew once on the outside. Liz tries to reconnect with her children but is too scared to do so. Liz later returns to Wentworth after having broken the conditions of her parole.

Fletch
Matthew "Fletch" Fletcher (Aaron Jeffery) (seasons 1–3) is a correctional officer at Wentworth. Fletcher is shown to have previously been a soldier who served in various war zones, including East Timor. His experience with a young girl being shot leaves him with PTSD and nightmares, and he is shown to easily lose his temper under stress. He attempts to have a relationship with fellow corrections officer Vera Bennett, but it ends after she reads a journal filled with expressions of rage as part of his therapy. He has a contentious relationship with Officer Will Jackson, and it is later revealed that he had a brief affair with Will's wife Meg Jackson; she became pregnant with his child and had an abortion just weeks before her death in the prison. This leads to the two having a brawl in the boiler room during a prison riot. He is also shown as being transphobic towards Maxine when she arrives at Wentworth.

He has doubts and reservations about Governor Ferguson and suspects her abuse but is initially unable to prove it. During Ferguson's attempt to remove drugs from the prison, Franky implicates Fletch as a potential source for smuggling, causing him to fight with Franky in her cell. At the end of season 2, during Bea's plan to escape and take revenge on Brayden Holt, Jess seduces Fletch in the shower, enabling Bea to steal his access card and gather supplies. A distraught Fletch takes his concerns to Channing after Ferguson attempts to transfer him out, but the investigation is shut down when Ferguson uncovers evidence of Channing's prostitution ring and blackmails him. After encountering an inmate who was previously tortured by Ferguson at Blackmoor Prison, he learns of her involvement with an inmate named Jianna and vendetta against Will Jackson and plans to report it to the board, however en route to Will's house he is struck by a speeding van driven by Ferguson's accomplice and nearly killed.

During season 3, Fletcher spends his time recovering from his attack, which leaves him both physically injured and with severe mental damage and amnesia. Will visits to finally put their past behind them. Vera also comes to visit him during his rehab, which is later discovered by Ferguson. After a severe bout of depression and alcoholism, Vera gives him advice that helps him start to get back on track, and Ferguson and Channing offer him his job back in an attempt to discover what he still remembers. Seeing Bea's drawing of Ferguson's henchman triggers his memory and he finally pieces together what happened to him. He allies himself with Bea and Vera to finally take Ferguson down by using their knowledge of her past against her.

Will Jackson
 
Will Jackson (Robbie Magasiva) (seasons 1–8) is a correctional officer at Wentworth. Will is a former social worker who transferred to corrections. Will was married to the previous governor, Meg Jackson. After Meg was killed during a riot at the prison Will spiralled into a depression that he tried to cure with alcohol and drugs. At one point, Will overdosed but Fletch managed to save him. during season 7 is promoted to acting governor, which later he is promoted to governor

Jacs Holt

Jacqueline "Jacs" Holt (Kris McQuade) (season 1) was an inmate at Wentworth. Jacs was serving fourteen years for the manslaughter of an associate of her husband, Vinnie Holt. Jacs was in a competition for "Top Dog" with Franky Doyle, often insulting Franky's sexuality and ordering hits to try and take her out of the running. Jacs attempts to befriend Bea Smith when she was new to the prison, often alluding to how horrible it would be if something were to happen to Bea's daughter, Debbie, if Bea was not going to co-operate with Jacs wishes. After Bea siding with Franky, Jacs orders her son, Brayden to kill Debbie by heroin overdose. Jacs is confronted by Bea after she hears the news about Debbie's death, and Bea stabs a pen into Jacs neck, killing her.

Boomer
Sue "Boomer" Jenkins (Katrina Milosevic) (seasons 1–8) is an inmate at Wentworth who is serving time for grievous bodily harm and drug trafficking. Boomer is best friends with Franky Doyle and serves as her muscle. Boomer is often portrayed as a slow and sometimes mentally challenged individual but, it is revealed that she has Fetal Alcohol Spectrum Disorder as a result of her mother ingesting alcohol while she was pregnant with Boomer. This brain based disability is the reason that she struggles with many cognitive issues.

Erica Davidson
Erica Davidson (Leeanna Walsman) (season 1) was the Governor of Wentworth after Meg Jackson. Before becoming the governor, Erica was a prisoner advocate, and an acquaintance of Franky Doyle. Although engaged, Erica explores her feelings for Franky, hinting that she is bisexual but always denies it.

Meg Jackson
Meg Jackson (Catherine McClements) (season 1) was the Governor of Wentworth Correctional Centre. Meg was married to Will Jackson, an officer at Wentworth. She also had an affair with Fletcher which led to an abortion two weeks before the riot. Meg died during a riot at the prison after being stabbed in the chest with a shiv. It is later revealed that Meg was killed by Franky Doyle accidentally.

Joan Ferguson

Joan Ferguson (Pamela Rabe) (seasons 2–8) became the Governor of Wentworth after Erica Davidson. Before being the governor, Ferguson was a correctional officer at Blackmoor Prison, where she shared a special bond with an inmate named Jianna, who was pregnant. She becomes a prisoner in season 4. She appears as hallucinations in season 6. She appeared briefly in the season 7 finale where it was teased that she would return for season 8.

Karen Proctor

Karen "Kaz" Proctor (Tammy MacIntosh) (seasons 3–7) is an inmate at Wentworth and the leader of the Red Right Hand. She also acts as a maternal figure for Allie which adds to tension between her and Bea.

In episode 4 of season 7 Kaz is murdered by an unknown assailant, it is later revealed that corrupt prison officer Sean Brody killed Kaz to silence her as she knew about Marie's escape plan.

Allie Novak

Allie Novak (Kate Jenkinson) (seasons 4–8) is an inmate at Wentworth and a member of the Red Right Hand. She is a former prostitute and drug addict until she met Kaz, who got her out of that life. She is loyal to Kaz but later falls in love with Bea, becoming devastated at her death and wanting revenge on Ferguson. In season 6 she falls in love with Ruby Mitchell, but also begins to doubt Kaz after her former lover, Marie Winter, is arrested and incarcerated at Wentworth.

Bridget Westfall
Bridget Westfall (Libby Tanner) (seasons 3–6) is a forensic psychologist who works with the inmates at Wentworth. Bridget identifies as a lesbian, and has feelings for Franky Doyle, which Franky reciprocates. Bridget's feelings for Franky develops far enough where Bridget decides to quit because of the suspicion from other prisoners and staff. When Franky gets out of prison she goes to live with Bridget.

Maxine Conway

Maxine Conway (Socratis Otto) (seasons 2–5) is a transgender inmate at Wentworth. Maxine was sent to Wentworth after stabbing her boyfriend, Gary, with scissors after he cut off her hair as a result of Maxine's gender reassignment surgery. Maxine is seen as the muscle in the prison, often affiliated with Bea Smith as her second in command. Upon Maxine's entry into Wentworth she was trumped with transphobic insults and bets as to whether she had a penis or vagina. After Maxine's adjustment to prison life, her boyfriend's brother comes to visit her and leaves her male looking clothes and a visitors pass that Maxine uses to try and escape the prison. Vera, upon finishing her shift, noticed that Maxine was trying to escape and called out to Will to stop Maxine from leaving. After being taken back into the prison, Vera refuses to give Maxine her wig back. In season 4, Maxine is diagnosed with breast cancer. In season 5, after having a double mastectomy, Maxine is transferred to Barnhurst prison as they have a better treatment facility to help with her chemotherapy.

Jake Stewart
Jake Stewart (Bernard Curry) (seasons 4–8) is a senior officer who served as a guard at Walford Prison before being transferred to Wentworth, Stewart shared a sexual relationship with guard Sean Brody. Stewart serves as acting deputy governor when Will is suspended for drugs, and is the father of Vera's baby Grace.

Sonia Stevens
Sonia Stevens (Sigrid Thornton) (seasons 4–6) made her first appearance during the fourth series episode "Divide and Conquer", broadcast on 14 June 2016. Thornton appeared in the original Prisoner television series as Roslyn Coulson, making her the first actress to star in both Prisoner and Wentworth. The character was partly inspired by Prisoner's Sonia Stevens, who was played by Tina Bursill. Thornton's Sonia is "a wealthy but self-made dynamo behind a cosmetics empire." She is accused of murdering a missing woman and sent to Wentworth prison on remand. Sonia was killed by Kaz Proctor, pushing her off the roof.

Rita Connors
Rita Connors (Leah Purcell) (seasons 6–8) is an inmate at Wentworth, and the older sister of Ruby Mitchell. She is a member of a biker gang. It is later revealed that Connors is not actually her last name, and she is an undercover cop.

Ruby Mitchell
Ruby Mitchell (Rarriwuy Hick) (seasons 6–8) is an inmate at Wentworth, and the younger sister of Rita Connors. She is a boxer, and is revealed to have accidentally killed the son of Marie Winter. She later forms a relationship with Allie Novak. A sheet of paper on her cell door in season 7 spells her name "Roobi".

Marie Winter
Marie Winter (Susie Porter) (seasons 6–8) is an inmate at Wentworth, a businesswoman, and the co-owner of a brothel along with Derek Channing. She once had a relationship with Allie Novak, which led Allie to drugs and prostitution until Kaz stopped it. She has an affair with Will Jackson, and was arrested for assaulting a doctor who was unable to save her son. In season 7 she is elected Top Dog following the death of Kaz Proctor.

Recurring characters

Inmates

Kim Chang
Kim Chang (Ra Chapman) (seasons 1–5) is an inmate at Wentworth. Kim was Franky's friend with benefits inside the prison. Kim was often seen as Franky's weakness when she was Top Dog, which other inmates would try to exploit. Kim makes parole and leaves on bad terms with Franky, as Kim goes back to her boyfriend once outside. Kim later breaks the conditions of her parole and is sent back to Wentworth. Kim reveals that she did it on purpose to be with Franky because she loves her, but is angered when Franky has moved on. Later on, she becomes a drug user and joins the Asian crew as Tina's drug mule.

Simmo
Simone "Simmo" Slater (Ally Fowler) (seasons 1–3) was an inmate at Wentworth. Simmo was one of Jacs Holt's henchmen, and had connections with Jacs' family and business on the outside world. Simmo was a recovering heroin addict, until her husband ordered her to kill Bea Smith at the request of Vinnie Holt to avenge the murder of his wife, Jacs. Simmo refuses to kill Bea and goes to Franky for drugs, with which she intended to use to kill herself but Bea Smith discovered her in time. After Simmo recovers, she again refuses to kill Bea. Later, Bea discovers Simmo in her room after dying of a heroin overdose. It is later discovered that Governor Ferguson gave Simmo a hot shot of Pink Dragon heroin.

Roz Jago
Rosalind "Roz" Jago (Benne Harrison) (seasons 1–2) was one of Jacs' henchmen, and later Simmo's friend and muscle source. After being framed for painting graffiti mocking Ferguson, she and the other members of Jacs' gang, except Simmo, are transferred to another block.

Sky Pierson
Sky Pierson (Kathryn Beck) (season 2) is an inmate at Wentworth. Sky is heavily addicted to heroin and one of Franky's henchmen. Sky is shown constantly trying to score heroin and even threatens to cut it out of the stomach of a new inmate after she was arrested for drug trafficking. Sky only appears in the second season, her fate is currently unknown.

Jess Warner

Jess Warner (Georgia Chara) (seasons 2–3) was an inmate at Wentworth. Jess was serving a five-year sentence for the murder of a baby.

Sophie Donaldson
Sophie Donaldson (Edwina Samuels) (seasons 2–3) is an inmate at Wentworth and Liz Birdsworth's daughter. Sophie was sent to prison for driving under the influence of alcohol on a suspended license and hit a cyclist. She bonds with Franky, but takes a while to reconnect with Liz. In season 4 she is mentioned to have been transferred to Barnhurst.

Kelly Bryant
Kelly Bryant (Christen O'Leary) (seasons 2–3) was a prisoner at the same place Ferguson was a guard before Wentworth. She is transferred to Wentworth in late season 2, but after Ferguson finds out she is there, she has her transferred to Barnhurst, though Fletch manages to interrogate her about Ferguson's past.

Lindsay Coulter
Lindsay Coulter (Kasia Kaczmarek) (seasons 2–3) is a kitchen worker at Wentworth, and a member of Franky's drug crew.

Jodie Spiteri
Jodie Spiteri (Pia Miranda) (season 3) is a kitchen worker at Wentworth, and a member of Franky's drug crew. After Bea finds out about Franky's drugs, she frames Jodie for possession. Ferguson tortures her into stabbing Bea, and when Bea and Franky try to get her to retaliate, Ferguson stops them and manipulates Jodie into self-harming even more, causing her to be moved to the psychiatric ward.

Lucy Gambaro
Lucy "Juice" Gambaro (Sally-Anne Upton) (seasons 3–6) is an inmate at Wentworth.  She and her crew are often predatory towards new or young prisoners and are known to gang-rape victims.  "Juice" has Hepatitis-C and pricks Vera with an infected needle while holding her hostage. In season 5, she has her tongue cut out by Joan Ferguson. She returns in season 6, as a member of Vicky Kosta's gang.

Tina Mercado
Tina Mercado (Charlie Tjoe) (seasons 3–5)
Tina is the leader of one of Wentworth's drug trafficking groups. She and her followers don't follow Bea's rules, which often results in Tina getting bashed by Maxine. In season 6, she is mentioned to have given an alibi for the murder Franky is accused of, exonerating Franky.

Cindy Lou
Cindy Lou (Miles Paras) (season 3)
Cindy Lou is a non-English speaking member of Tina Mercado's gang. She at first appears to be the leader, having Tina translate for her to avoid suspicion. She is also a drug user. After the group intimidates Franky, she gets help from Lucy Gambaro and her gang and outs Tina as the leader. She later dies from an overdose of drugs brought in by Kim Chang after she returns to Wentworth.

Mel Barrett
Mel Barrett (Sophia Katos) (seasons 4–5) is a member of the Red Right Hand. She appears to be Kaz's right-hand woman. During the election for Top Dog she, Liz and Sonia count the votes.

Stella Radic
Stella Radic (Bessie Holland) (season 2–6) is Lucy Gambaro's right hand. The most notable member of "the boys" gang. Bleached blonde hair that is always styled differently. In season 6 she and Lucy have joined Vicky Kosta's gang.

Dana Malouf
Dana Malouf (Daniielle Alexis) (season 5) was a featured extra in the Red Right Hand gang.

Hutch
Jen "Hutch" Hutchins (Sarah Hallam) (seasons 5–7) is an inmate with long blonde hair. She defends Ferguson in "Coup De Grace", insisting "it was self defense Franky" when Franky accuses Joan of murder. In season 6 she has become a member of Vicky Kosta's gang, and records the fights on a phone. In season 7 she appears to be Vicky Kosta's right hand woman.

Mon Alston
Mon Alston (Emily Havea) (seasons 6–8) is a member of the Red Right Hand. She appears to be Kaz's right hand woman following Mel Barrett's disappearance. In "Ascension" she accuses Marie of having killed Kaz, and attempts to murder her, before being stopped by Allie.

Vicky Kosta
Victoria "Vicky" Kosta (Artemis Ioannides) (seasons 6–7) is a gang leader in Wentworth. In season 6, in addition to being the main drug dealer following Tina Mercado's disappearance, she also organizes a fight club in which inmates fight and place bets. Her gang in season 6 includes Hutch, Cherry Li, Lucy Gambaro and Stella Radic. In season 7 she attempts to become Top Dog after Kaz's death, but is framed for her murder by Marie, though later cleared. In the finale, she is among those taken hostage, and is shot and killed by Sean Brody.

Drago
Zara "Drago" Dragovich (Natalia Novikova) (season 6) is Marie Winter's business associate and right-hand woman. After Rita gives information on a deal Marie is doing, she and others are arrested for sex trafficking. She distrusts Rita, despite Marie's skepticism, and tries to prove her a rat. Eventually she finds out that Ruby killed Marie's son, and tries to kill her in the fight club, where Rita kills her to protect Ruby.

Cherry Li
Cherry Li (Sun Park) (season 6) is a member of Vicky Kosta's gang. She once worked as a prostitute at a brothel owned by Marie, which she was fired from after being scarred. She tries to kill Marie for this after her arrest, only to be stopped by Rita. Later she defeats Boomer in the fight club. After Drago suspects Rita of being the rat, the police plant evidence suggesting Cherry is the rat, and Drago attacks her, turning her into a quadriplegic. Boomer is initially blamed for this due to the fight club, but Rita later tells the police the truth.

May Jenkins
May Jenkins (Anni Finsterer) (season 7) is Boomer's abusive mother. She is an alcoholic. She sponsors Boomer for her day release, but later gets them both arrested for shoplifting. She is remanded to Wentworth, where she continues to bully her daughter. Liz eventually helps Boomer stand up to her. In the finale, after Boomer attempts to end the siege by taking Marie hostage, Brody kills May as punishment.

Narelle Stang
Narelle Stang (Morgana O'Reilly) (season 7) is the sister of a man who was assaulted by the Red Right Hand, leaving him mentally handicapped. He was assaulted for something he didn't do. Narelle is arrested for assault, and finds out that Kaz is in Wentworth as well. She also knows Rita under the name "Rita Harris", and knows she is an undercover cop. She blackmails Rita to kill Kaz with this information, but Ruby eventually stops this by confessing to Narelle's crime.

Staff

Linda Miles
Linda Miles (Jacquie Brennan) (seasons 1–8) is an officer at Wentworth.  Miles has a gambling problem and is corruptible. Linda is nicknamed "Smiles" for her cold demeanor, Linda does favours for prisoners and during season 7 is promoted to acting deputy governor as Will is promoted to acting governor as Vera steps back from her duties. Linda racks up debt of $20,000 and is taken hostage during the Wentworth Siege. In series 8 Linda suffers from PTSD after the siege.

Derek Channing
Derek Channing (Martin Sacks) (seasons 1–6) is the regional director for Wentworth.  He is a member of the board of directors who regularly checks in on the facility.

Rose Atkins
Rose Atkins (Maggie Naouri) (seasons 2–3) is a nurse who works in the medical centre at Wentworth. Has a relationship with Will Jackson. Disappears after season 3, for unknown reasons.

Lee Radcliffe
Nurse Lee Radcliffe (Maddy Jevic) (seasons 4–6) is another nurse. Her nickname is "Nurse Ratshit". She appears after Rose Atkins leaves. She isn't sympathetic toward the prisoners unlike her predecessor. She has a brief relationship with Jake Stewart, which information is later used to blackmail her. Vera discovers this in Season 6, and later fires her for this. She uses the excuse that some drugs were missing and she couldn't account for them. These drugs were discreetly given to Jake because he had "trouble sleeping". Jake lied to her, the drugs were actually for Will due to his guilt over having buried Ferguson alive.

Sean Brody
Sean Brody (Rick Donald) (season 7) was a former officer of Walford Prison who shared a sexual relationship with guard Jake Stewart. Brody comes to Wentworth and when he does he brings trouble with him. He manages to manipulate everyone, he puts Linda into debt, lets Kosta take the fall for Kaz's death and gets Jake suspended. Brody takes the prison hostage in order to get Marie Winter out but his plan fails and he is shot and killed by Allie Novak.

Other characters

Vinnie Holt
Vinnie Holt (John Bach) (season 1) is Jacs Holt's husband and Brayden Holt's father. Before her death he asks Jacs for a divorce shortly before her death in order to marry one of his mistresses. He later orders a "hit" on Bea Smith, which isn't seen through. It is later discovered that he has died of a heart attack after his son's funeral.

Rita Bennett
Rita Bennett (Lynette Curran) (seasons 1–2) is Vera Bennett’s mother, who is later killed by Vera via morphine overdose.

Debbie Smith
Debbie Smith (Georgia Flood) (seasons 1–2, 4) is Bea Smith's daughter. She is killed by Brayden Holt via drug overdose.

Brayden Holt
Brayden Holt (Reef Ireland) (seasons 1–2) the son of Jacs and Vinnie Holt. He murdered Debbie Smith under the orders of his mother. Brayden is later killed by Bea (who escaped from the hospital after a fight with Franky Doyle to do so), via a gun shot to the head.

Harry Smith
Harry Smith (Jake Ryan) (season 1–3) is Bea's ex-husband and father of Debbie Smith. Will Jackson was accused of his murder, but it was revealed later that he was killed by one of Ferguson's accomplices.

Colin Bates
Colin  Bates (Steve Le Marquand) (season 2) ruthless rapist serving time in Walford Prison.

Nash Taylor
Nash Taylor (Luke McKenzie) (seasons 2–5) is the father of Doreen Anderson's baby.

Imogen Fessler
Imogen Fessler (Rachael Maza) (seasons 4–5) is Franky's boss at the legal clinic she works at following her release from Wentworth. Franky hires her as her lawyer after she is arrested for Mike Pennisi's murder.

Detective Ayoub
Detective Ayoub (Maria Mercedes) (seasons 5–6) is a detective investigating Liz Birdsworth for perjury against Sonia Stevens. She believes Liz colluded with someone to incite false testimony. Mercedes appeared in the original Prisoner television series as Irene Zervos and Yemil Bakarta.

See also
 List of Wentworth episodes

References

Lists of drama television characters
Lists of Australian television series characters
Characters